Frederick Oswald Thomas (19 November 1917 – 20 February 2003) was a Scottish cricketer.  Thomas was a right-handed batsman who bowled right-arm medium pace.  He was born at Corstorphine, Midlothian.

In 1947, Thomas made a single Minor Counties Championship appearance for Cambridgeshire against Norfolk.

Thomas also played a single first-class match for Scotland against Worcestershire in 1951.  In his only first-class match, he scored 21 runs at a batting average of 10.50, with a high score of 21.

Thomas died at Edinburgh, Midlothian on 20 February 2003.

References

External links
Frederick Thomas at Cricinfo
Frederick Thomas at CricketArchive

1917 births
2003 deaths
Cricketers from Edinburgh
Scottish cricketers
Cambridgeshire cricketers